"Coming Undone' is a song written and recorded by the American rock band Tantric. The song was released as the second and final single from their 2009 fourth studio album Mind Control.

Charts

References

Tantric (band) songs
2009 singles
2009 songs
Songs written by Hugo Ferreira